Brian Keith Lord (born 1961) is an American murderer whose case was featured on Forensic Files.

Murders 

In 1974, at the age of 13, Lord murdered his friend's mother by shooting her in the back as she hung clothes on a clothesline. "For that crime, Lord served only six months in a juvenile detention facility and was released."

In 1986, at the age of 25, he was hired as a carpenter at the home of Wayne and Sharon Frye, neighbors of 16-year-old Tracy Parker. Lord subsequently became acquainted with Tracy, who often rode horses owned by the Fryes. Finding himself alone with her on the night of September 16, 1986, Lord persuaded her to get into his truck under the guise of giving her a ride home. He drove to his brother's workshop, somehow coerced her into going inside, and raped and murdered her.

Investigation
Investigation into Tracy's disappearance initially focused on the Fryes. Her last discernible interaction was a telephone call made by her to her friend from their residence. A manhunt took place, and some of her blood-soaked clothes were found in a wooded area on the weekend of September 20. Her semi-nude body was found on September 30.

Investigators began considering Lord as a suspect after it was discovered that he called his family roughly ten minutes prior to Tracy from the same phone that Tracy called her friend on. Lord denied any involvement and informed police that he had traveled to his brother's workshop that night. The workshop was investigated as a possible murder location which led to the discovery of a large blood spot on the floor; samples of material from the workshop were collected. A green paint chip found on Tracy's body was matched to a dismantled fence that Lord had hauled in his truck, thus incriminating him.

Prosecution
Lord was arrested, tried, convicted, and sentenced to death in 1987. During the trial, he leveled threats at the Parker family. His death sentence was voided in 1997, his conviction was overturned in 1999, and after much delay, was given a new trial in 2003. Lord was again convicted and was given a life sentence.

See also
 List of United States death row inmates

References

American people convicted of murder
People convicted of murder by Washington (state)
American rapists
American murderers of children
Minors convicted of murder
American prisoners sentenced to death
American prisoners sentenced to life imprisonment
Prisoners sentenced to death by Washington (state)
Prisoners sentenced to life imprisonment by Washington (state)
Living people
1961 births